The 1977–78 Montana State Bobcats men's basketball team represented Montana State University during the 1977–78 NCAA Division I men's basketball season.

Roster

Schedule

References 

Montana State Bobcats men's basketball seasons
Montana State
Montana State Bobcats basketball
Montana State Bobcats basketball